Fimbristylis blepharolepis is a sedge of the family Cyperaceae that is native to Australia.

It blooms between May and June and produces brown flowers.

In Western Australia it is found in and around swamps in the Kimberley region.

References

Plants described in 1963
Flora of Western Australia
blepharolepis
Taxa named by Johannes Hendrikus Kern